Emanuel Hana Shaleta (born November 11, 1956) is a prelate of the Chaldean Catholic Church and serves as eparch for the Chaldean Catholic Eparchy of Saint Peter the Apostle of San Diego.

Biography
On May 31, 1984, Bishop Shaleta was ordained to the priesthood. Pope Francis appointed Bp. Shaleta eparch for the Chaldean Catholic Eparchy of Saint Peter the Apostle of San Diego on August 9, 2017. On August 29, 2017, Shaleta was installed as eparch.

See also

 Catholic Church hierarchy
 Catholic Church in the United States
 Historical list of the Catholic bishops of the United States
 List of Catholic bishops of the United States
 Lists of patriarchs, archbishops, and bishops

References

External links

 Chaldean Catholic Eparchy of Saint Peter the Apostle of San Diego Official Site 

1956 births
Living people
People from Zakho
Chaldean bishops
American Eastern Catholic bishops
21st-century Eastern Catholic bishops
Bishops appointed by Pope Francis